Thomas Jenkinson may refer to:

Thomas Jenkinson (MP) (fl. 16th century), English member of Parliament for Leicester
Tom Jenkinson (footballer) (1865–?), Scottish footballer (Heart of Midlothian and Scotland)
Thomas Jenkinson (English footballer) (fl. 1914–1916), English footballer (Bradford City)
Thomas Jenkinson (footballer, born 1877) (1877–1949), English footballer (Sheffield United, Grimsby Town)
Squarepusher (born 1975), pseudonym of Tom Jenkinson, British recording artist